Hobby Lobby may refer to:

 Hobby Lobby, a chain of arts and crafts stores in the United States
 Burwell v. Hobby Lobby Stores, Inc. a 2014 United States Supreme Court case involving the above chain
 Hobby Express, an unrelated retailer of remote-controlled toys previously called Hobby Lobby International
 Charley Weaver's Hobby Lobby, a 1959-1960 television series